John Hinchliffe (born 4 June 1938) is a Scottish former professional footballer who made 206 appearances in the English Football League playing as a right half for Aston Villa, Workington  and Hartlepools United. He also played non-league football for Weymouth, where he played 54 matches in all competitions and scored twice as his team won the 1964–65 Southern Football League title, Netherfield and Durham City. He represented Scotland at schoolboy level.

Hinchliffe was born in 1938 in Tillicoultry, Clackmannanshire.

References

1938 births
Living people
People from Tillicoultry
Scottish footballers
Association football wing halves
Aston Villa F.C. players
Workington A.F.C. players
Hartlepool United F.C. players
Weymouth F.C. players
Kendal Town F.C. players
Durham City A.F.C. players
English Football League players
Sportspeople from Clackmannanshire